Yerevan is the capital of Armenia.

Yerevan may also refer to:

Places
Yerevan Botanical Garden
Yerevan Cascade, a giant stairway in Yerevan, Armenia
Yerevan Fortress, a 16th-century fortress in Yerevan
Yerevan History Museum
Yerevan Lake, a lake in Yerevan
Yerevan Metro
Yerevan Square, a major square in Tbilisi, Georgia now renamed Freedom Square
Yerevan TV Tower
Yerevan Velodrome, an outdoor velodrome or track cycling venue in Yerevan, Armenia
Yerevan Zoo, a zoological garden of Yerevan

Brand names
Yerevan Ararat Brandy Factory
Yerevan Brandy Company

Culture
Yerevan International Film Festival
Yerevan Komitas State Conservatory
Yerevan Opera Theatre
Yerevan State Musical Comedy Theatre

Sports
BKMA Yerevan, an Armenian football club from Yerevan
CSKA Yerevan, a former Armenian football club from Yerevan
Erebuni Yerevan, originally Homenmen-FIMA Yerevan, Armenian football club from Yerevan
FC Arabkir Yerevan, a former Armenian football club from Yerevan
FC Dinamo Yerevan, a former Armenian football club from Yerevan
FC Spartak Yerevan, a former Armenian football club from Yerevan
FC Van Yerevan, an Armenian football club from Yerevan
FC Yerazank Yerevan, an Armenian football club from Yerevan
FC Yerevan, an Armenian football club based in Yerevan
Malatia Yerevan, a former Armenian football club from Yerevan
RUOR Yerevan, an Armenian football club from Yerevan
SC Nairi Yerevan, a former Armenian football club from Yerevan
SKIF Yerevan, an Armenian football club from Yerevan
Yerevan United FC, an Armenian football from Yerevan

Universities and institutes
Yerevan Computer Research and Development Institute
Yerevan Physics Institute
Yerevan State Linguistic University
Yerevan State Medical University
Yerevan State University
Yerevan State University of Architecture and Construction

Other uses
Yerevan dialect
Yerevan-Avia, a privately owned airline operating international cargo flights from Yerevan
Asia/Yerevan, a time zone identifier from zone file of the IANA time zone database